This is a list of compositions by Johann Nepomuk Hummel.

By opus numbers 

This list is sorted by opus number.

 Op. 1, 3 sets of Variations for piano (London, 1791)
 1. The Plough Boy in C major
 2. Bluhe Liebes Veilhen in G major
 3. La Belle Catherine in C major
 Op. 2, 2 sets of Variations for piano (London, 1791)
 1. The Lass of Richmond Hill in G major
 2. Jem of Aberdeen in G major
 Op. 2a, 3 Sonatas (London, 1792)
 1. For Violin (or Flute), Violoncello, and Piano in B♭ major
 2. For Violin (or Flute) and Piano in G major
 3. For Piano, No. 1, in C major
 Op. 3, 3 sets of Variations for piano (London, 1794)
 1. A Rondo of Pleyel in C major
 2. The Lass of Richmond Hill in G major (Opus 2–1)
 3. Wenn's Immer So War in G major
 Op. 3a, Trio for Violin, Violoncello, and Piano, No. 1, in B♭ major (1792). Not described as a trio by the composer, and not included in otherwise complete sets.
 Op. 4, 3 Cadenzas for Piano Concertos by Mozart (1790s)
 1. for K 413
 2. K 414
 3. K 415
 Op. 5, 3 Sonatas (Vienna, circa 1798)
 1. For Violin in B major
 2. For Violin in F major
 3. For Viola in E major
 Op. 6, Variations for Piano and Orchestra (Vienna, circa 1798). Theme by Foglar (F major)
 Op. 7, 3 Fugues on the Style of Handel (Vienna, circa 1799)
 1. Fugue in D minor
 2. Fugue in E major
 3. Fugue in F minor
 Op. 8, Variations for Piano on a Traditional Austrian Song in F major (Vienna, circa 1801)
 Op. 9, Variations for Piano on a March by Cherubini in E major (Vienna, circa 1802)
 Op. 10, Variations for Piano on "God Save The King" in D major (Vienna, circa 1804)
 Op. 11, Rondo Favori for Piano in E major (Vienna, circa 1804)
 Op. 12, Trio for Violin, Violoncello, and Piano, No. 2, in E♭ major (Vienna, circa 1803)
 Op. 13, Sonata for Piano, No. 2 in E major (Vienna, circa 1803–1805)
 Op. 14, Variations for Flute and Piano in G major (Vienna, circa 1803). Theme by Meyule
 Op. 15, Variations for Piano on an Aria from Dalayrac's "Les Deux Petits Savoyards" in A minor (Vienna, circa 1804)
 Op. 16, 6 German Dances (1804). For orchestra. Also for piano (Vienna, circa 1804)
 Op. 17, Concerto for Violin and Piano in G major (Vienna, circa 1805)
 Op. 17a, Cadenza to Mozart's Piano Concerto, K 595
 Op. 18, Fantasy for Piano in E major (Vienna, circa 1805)
 Op. 19, Rondo-Fantasy for Piano in E major (Vienna, circa 1806)
 Op. 20, Sonata for Piano, No. 3 in F minor (Vienna, circa 1807)  
 Op. 21, Variations for Piano on a Dutch Song in B major (Vienna, circa 1806)
 Op. 22, Trio for Violin, Violoncello, and Piano, No. 3 in F major (Vienna, circa 1799–1807)
 Op. 23, 7 Hungarian Dances (1806). For orchestra. Also for piano (Vienna, circa 1806)
 Op. 24, 12 Minuets (1806). For orchestra. Also for piano (Vienna, circa 1807)
 Op. 25, 12 German Dances and Coda (1807) For orchestra. Also for piano (Vienna, circa 1807)
 Op. 26, Ballet, Helene And Paris (1807)
 Op. 27, Dance for Apollosaal, No. 1 (1808). 12 minuets for orchestra. Also for chamber ensemble (Vienna, circa 1808)
 Op. 28, Dance for Apollosaal, No. 2 (1808). 12 German dances for orchestra. Also for piano (Vienna, circa 1808)
 Op. 29, 12 German Dances for Redout-Deutsche (1808). For orchestra. Also for chamber ensemble (Vienna, circa 1808)
 Op. 30, 3 String Quartets (Vienna, circa 1804–1808)
 1. No. 1 in C major
 2. No. 2 in G major
 3. No. 3 in E major
 Op. 31, Dance for Apollosaal, No. 3 (1809). 6 waltzes for orchestra. Also for piano (Vienna, circa 1810)
 Op. 32, Variations for Piano On "La Sentinelle" (1812)
 Op. 33, Ballet, Das belebte Gemählde (1809). Also for piano (Vienna, circa 1810)
 Op. 34, 3 Sets of Variations for Piano (Vienna, circa 1810–1812)
 1. La Sentinelle in C major
 2. Partant Bacchus La Syrie in D major
 3. Mozart's Opera in C major
 Op. 35, Trio for Violin, Violoncello, and Piano, No. 4 in G major (Vienna, circa 1808–1811)
 Op. 36, Concerto for Piano, No. 1 in C major (Vienna, circa 1811). Also known as Op. 34a
 Op. 37, 8 Pieces for Piano: "Choix Des Plus Beaux Morceaux De Musique" (Vienna, circa 1811)
 Op. 37a, Sonata for Mandolin and Piano in C major (Vienna, circa 1810). Also for violin and piano.
 Op. 38, Sonata for Piano, No. 4 in C major (Vienna, circa 1808)
 Op. 39, Dance for Apollosaal, No. 4 (1811). 4 German dances and coda for orchestra. Also for piano (Vienna, circa 1811)
 Op. 40, 12 German Dances for a Roman Emperor (1811). For orchestra. Also for chamber ensemble (Vienna, circa 1811)
 Op. 40a, Variations for Piano on a March from Isouard's "Cendrillon" in C major (Vienna, circa 1811–1812)
 Op. 41, Ballet, Quintuor Des Negares Du Ballet Paul Et Virginie (1809). Also for piano (Vienna, circa 1810)
 Op. 43, Overture to the opera Jovan of Finland in D minor (circa 1811). For orchestra. Also for two pianos (Vienna, circa 1812)
 Op. 46, Pantomime, Der Zauberring (1811)
 Op. 50, Sonata for Flute and Piano in D major
 Op. 51, Sonata for Piano 4-Hands in E
 Op. 53, Potpourris for Piano and Guitar
 Op. 54, Variations a la Monferina for the Piano Forte and Violoncello (c.1815)
 Op. 55, La Bella Capricciosa, Polacca for Clavicembalo
 Op. 56, Rondo Brilliant for Piano and Orchestra, in A
 Op. 57, Variations for Piano in F major on a theme from Gluck's Armide (1815)
 Op. 63, Grande Sérénade ... pour le Piano, Violon, Guitare, Clarinette et Basson ou Flûte et Violoncelle
 Op. 64, Sonata for Flute and Piano
 Op. 65, Trio for Violin, Violoncello, and Piano No. 5 in G major (ca. 1815) 
 Op. 66, Grande Serenade ... pour le Piano, Violon, Guitare, Clarinette et Basson ou Flûte et Violoncelle. 
 Op. 67, 24 Preludes in all major and minor keys for Piano (1815)
 Op. 68, Ballet, Sappho von Mitilene (1812) 
 Op. 69, Singspiel, Die Rückfahrt des Kaisers (1814)
 Op. 71, La sentinelle (1815), for  tenor solo, men's chorus (TTB), guitar and double bass
 Op. 73, Piano Concerto G major
 Op. 74, Septet for Piano, Winds and Strings in D minor
 Op. 75, Adagio, Variations and Rondo, to the favorite song "Pretty Polly", for the piano forte. 
 Op. 77, Mass in B major.
 Op. 78, Trio for Piano, Flute, and Violoncello (also published as Adagio, Variations and Rondo) in A major.
 Op. 80, Mass No. 2 for Four Soloists, Mixed Chorus, Orchestra and Organ in E Major.
 Op. 81, Piano Sonata No. 5 in F minor
 Op. 83, Trio for Violin, Violoncello, and Piano No. 6 in E major
 Op. 84, Lieder "An die Entfernte" 
 Op. 85, Concerto for Piano No. 2 in A minor 
 Op. 87, Quintet for Piano, Violin, Viola, Cello and Bass in E♭minor 
 Op. 89, Concerto for Piano No. 3 in B minor 
 Op. 89a, Alma Virgo, Offertorium for Soprano, Chorus and Orchestra
 Op. 91 Waltzes for Piano
 Op. 92, Sonata for Piano 4-Hands in A major
 Op. 93, Trio for Violin, Violoncello, and Piano No. 7 in E major.
 Op. 94, Potpourri for Viola and Orchestra on "Il mio tesoro"
 Op. 96, Trio for Violin, Violoncello, and Piano No. 8 in E major
 Op. 97, Variations in F major for piano and orchestra
 Op. 98, Introduction et rondo brillant for piano and orchestra
 Op. 99, Nocturne for small ensemble in F major 
 Op. 100, Opera, Mathilde von Guise (1810 rev. 1827) 
 Op. 101, Overture for Orchestra No. 1 in B major 
 Op. 102, Introduction and Variations for Oboe or Flute, with the Accompaniment of Piano or Orchestra in F major
 Op. 104, Sonata for Piano and Violoncello in A major
 Op. 105, Trois amusements en forme de caprices for Piano.
 Op. 106, Piano Sonata No. 6 in D major
 Op. 110, Concerto for Piano and Orchestra No. 4 in E major
 Op. 111, Mass No. 3 for Soloists, Chorus, and Orchestra in D major
 Op. 113, Concerto for Piano and Orchestra No. 5 in A major.
 Op. 114, Septet Militaire in C major
 Op. 115, Variations for Piano and Orchestra in B major on a theme from Das Fest der Handwerker.
 Op. 116, Oberons Zauberhorn for piano and orchestra 
 Op. 117, Gesellschafts-Rondo (Society Rondo) Op. 118, Air à la tirolienne avec variations Op. 119, Les Charmes de Londres Three Themes Varied for the Piano
 Op. 120, Rondo for Piano "La galante" in G major
 Op. 122, Rondo Villageois Op. 123, Fantasie for Piano on themes by Hummel and Sigismond Neukomm
 Op. 124, Fantasia on themes from "Le nozze di Figaro" Op. 125, Études for Piano (24)
 Op. 126, Rondo Brilliant for Violin and Piano in G major
 Op. 127, "Le Retour à Londres", Rondo Brilliant for Piano and Orchestra in F major
 Op. 127, (also?) Grand Posthumous Concerto for Piano And Orchestra in F major (published in London in 1853) 
 Op. post. 1 – Piano Concerto in F major
 Op. post. 2 – Variations for Violin and Piano in F major
 Op. post. 3 – Scotch Country Dance and Rondo for Piano in G major
 Op. post. 4, WoO 6 – Piano Quartet in G major
 Op. post. 5 – Rondo for Two Pianos in E major
 Op. post. 6 – Capriccio for Piano in E minor
 Op. post. 7 –  Two Preludes and Fugues for Organ in E major
 Op. post. 8 – Ricercar for Piano in D major
 Op. post. 9 – Six Pieces for Piano (1839)
 WoO 15 – Tantum ergo'' after Gluck

Sachs catalog 
This list is of compositions not published during Hummel's lifetime, or published shortly thereafter and compiled by Joel Sachs. WoO numbers (Werke ohne Opus) refer to works included in Zimmerschmied's catalogue.

 S 1 – Variations for piano in A major
 S 2 – Variations for piano on "Malbrouck" in C major
 S 3 – Piano Quartet in D major
 S 4, WoO 24 – Piano Concerto in A major
 S 5 – Piano Concerto in A major
 S 6 – Schmauchlied
 S 7 – Die Sehnsucht
 S 8 – Per pietà bel idol mio
 S 9 – Placa gli sdegni tuoi
 S 10 – Italian Songs
 S 11 – Mentri dormi amor
 S 12 – Se lontan
 S 13 – Je gut gesinnter Freunde
 S 14 – Chantons l'ami
 S 15 – Peuple naguere
 S 16 – Variations for piano on "Peuplu acqueres" in B flat major
 S 17 – Beneath the laurel's friendly shade
 S 18 – Variations for piano in D major
 S 19 – Variations for piano from Aline in C major
 S 20 – Variations for piano in C minor
 S 21 – Per te d'eterni allori
 S 22 – Figlio, le femmine son falsissime
 S 23 – Piano Sonata No.3 in F minor (original version)
 S 24 – Die eingebildeten Philosophen
 S 25, WoO 30 – Il viaggiator ridicolo (incomplete)
 S 26 – March for The citizen artilleryman party which should admire Vienna
 S 27 – Fantasia for piano in A flat major
 S 28 – Mandolin Concerto in G major
 S 29 – Dankgefühl einer Geretteten
 S 30, WoO 3 – String Trio in E flat major
 S 31 – Marpha
 S 32 – Irene
 S 33, WoO 11 – Der Durchzug durchs rote Meer
 S 34 – Tu me dis refrain
 S 35 – Toute la vie
 S 36 – Couplets d'accadie
 S 37 – L'amore
 S 38 – 2 Lieder
 S 39 – Piano piece in G major (incomplete)
 S 40 – 3 Pieces for Orfica
 S 41 – Demagorgon (incomplete)
 S 42 – Don Anchise Campione
 S 43 – Ich ward zu Wien
 S 44 – Der Whistspieler
 S 45 – Caro adorabile
 S 46, WoO 4 – String Trio in G major
 S 47, WoO 2 – Variations for orchestra on "O du lieber Augustin" in C major
 S 48 – Partita in E flat major
 S 49, WoO 1 – Trumpet Concerto in E major
 S 50, WoO 14 – Dominus Deo
 S 51, WoO 17 – Kyrie for Litania in A minor
 S 52, WoO 22 – Pro te respirar in E major
 S 53 – Sub tuum praesidium in B flat major
 S 54 – Salve Regina in G major
 S 55 – Plus non timet
 S 56, WoO 26 – Le vicende d'Amore
 S 57 – Amis connaissez-vous
 S 58 – Wieder she'ich
 S 59 – Des bergers de nos hameaux
 S 60 – Le bonheur de vivre au village
 S 61, WoO 29 – Die Messenier
 S 62, WoO 33 – Pigmalione
 S 63, WoO 23 – Bassoon Concerto in F major
 S 64 – Ja der Himmel (incomplete)
 S 65 – Die beyden Genies (lost)
 S 66, WoO 21 – Alma virgo Mater Dei in F major
 S 67, WoO 13 – Mass in D minor
 S 68, WoO 19 – O virgo itemerata in A major
 S 69 – Das Fest des Dankes und Freude (lost)
 S 70, WoO 16 – Te Deum in D major
 S 71, WoO 27 – Die vereitelten Ranke
 S 72 – In aeternum jubilantes in F major
 S 73, WoO 25 – Diana ed Endimione
 S 74, WoO 12 – Mass in C major
 S 76 – Cantata for the Name Day of Mr. Zinzendorf
 S 77, WoO 36 – Lob der Freundschaft
 S 78, WoO 5 – Clarinet Quartet in E flat major
 S 79, WoO 18 – Salve Regina in B flat major
 S 80 – Contredanse in B flat major
 S 81 – 5 Ecossaises
 S 82 – 7 Ländler
 S 83 – 3 Military Marches
 S 84 – 3 Pieces for Ballet or Pantomime
 S 85 – Stadt und Land (incomplete)
 S 86 – O ihr Geliebten
 S 87 – Cantata for the Wedding of Emperor Napoleon and Marie-Louise of Austria
 S 88, WoO 32 – Das Zauberschlofl
 S 89 – Ich gratulir' zum Namenfest
 S 90, WoO 28 – Das Haus ist zu verkaufen
 S 91, WoO 38 – Euterpens Abschied
 S 92, WoO 34 – Der Zauberkampf
 S 94 – Scena for Mourning of Haydn
 S 95 – Fünf sind Zwey
 S 96, WoO 20 – Offertory in F major
 S 97 – Der Junker in der Mühle
 S 99, WoO 35 – Der Löwe von Kurdistan
 S 100 – Angelica
 S 101 – Die Eselshaut oder Die blaue Insel
 S 102 – Frohlocket Freunden
 S 103 – Overture to Die gute Nachricht in D major
 S 104 – 12 Waltzes for orchestra in E flat major
 S 105 – Die Ahnfrau
 S 106a – Arrangement of Himmel's overture for piano trio
 S 106b – Arrangement of Himmel's overture for piano duet
 S 107 – Arrangement of Beethoven's overture to Prometheus in C major
 S 108–130 – Arrangement of overtures by various composers
 S 131 – Arrangement of Beethoven's Symphony No. 7 in A major
 S 132 – Arrangement of Beethoven's Symphony No. 2 in D major
 S 133 – Arrangement of Beethoven's Symphony No. 3 in E flat major
 S 134 – Arrangement of Beethoven's Symphony No. 4 in B flat major
 S 135 – Arrangement of Beethoven's Symphony No. 5 in C minor
 S 136 – Arrangement of Beethoven's Symphony No. 6 in F major
 S 137 – Arrangement of Beethoven's Symphony No. 1 in C major
 S 138 – Arrangement of Mozart's Piano Concerto K 466 in D minor
 S 139 – Arrangement of Mozart's Piano Concerto K 503 in C major
 S 140 – Arrangement of Mozart's Piano Concerto K 365 in E flat major
 S 141 – Arrangement of Mozart's Piano Concerto K 491 in C minor
 S 142 – Arrangement of Mozart's Piano Concerto K 537 in D major
 S 143 – Arrangement of Mozart's Piano Concerto K 482 in E flat major
 S 144 – Arrangement of Mozart's Piano Concerto K 456 in B flat major
 S 145 – Variation on God Save the King for piano
 S 146 – Rondino for harp & piano in E flat major
 S 147 – Piece for flute in G major
 S 148 – Freudenfest-Ouverture in D major
 S 149 – Romanza for piano in E flat major
 S 150 – Arrangement of Beethoven's Septet op 20 in E flat major
 S 150a – Piano accompaniment for 2 songs by P. Hédouin
 S 151 – Arrangement of Mozart's Symphony K 504 in D major
 S 152 – Arrangement of Mozart's Symphony K 550 in G minor
 S 153 – Arrangement of Mozart's Symphony K 543 in E flat major
 S 154 – Arrangement of Mozart's Symphony K 425 in C major
 S 155 – Arrangement of Mozart's Symphony K 385 in D major
 S 156 – Arrangement of Mozart's Symphony K 551 in C major
 S 157 – Ausführlich theoretisch-practische Anweisung zum Pianoforte Spiel
 S 158 – Birthday Cantata for Goethe (1822)
 S 159 – Birthday Cantata for Prince Weimar-Sachsen (1823)
 S 160 – Birthday Cantata for Prince Weimar-Sachsen (revised version)
 S 161 – Variation on a waltz by Diabelli for piano
 S 162 – Marche à la romaine for piano in E flat major
 S 163 – Attila (lost)
 S 164 – Variations for piano in E major
 S 165 – Rondoletto for piano in C major
 S 166 – Einmal nur in unserm Leben
 S 167 – Birthday Cantata for Goethe (1825)
 S 167a – Album piece for piano
 S 168, WoO 7 – Impromptu in Canone for piano in G major
 S 169 – 5 Settings of Scottish Songs for Thompson
 S 170, WoO 37 – Morgen opfer
 S 171 – Strahlen die aus Osten stammen
 S 172 – Birthday Cantata for Prince Weimar-Sachsen (1827)
 S 173 – Song for the Birthday of Goethe (1827)
 S 174 – Arrangement of Romberg's Symphony No.1 in E flat major
 S 175, WoO 39 – Have!
 S 176 – Volkslied aller Deutschen
 S 177 – Song for the Birthday of Goethe in B flat major
 S 178 – Trauermusik
 S 179 – Cantata for the Wedding of Princess Augusta von Weimar-Sachsen
 S 180 – Song for the Birthday of Goethe (1829)
 S 181, WoO 9 – Adagio for piano in D flat major
 S 182 – 12 Settings of Scottish Songs for Thompson
 S 183 – Arrangement of Haydn's Symphony No. 100 in G major
 S 185 – Arrangement of Haydn's Symphony No. 44 in E minor
 S 186 – Canon: Think on your friend
 S 187, WoO 10 – Variation for piano on "Rule Britannia"
 S 188 – Piano piece in A flat major
 S 189 – Canon a 3
 S 190, WoO 8 – Fantasia for piano in C major "Souvenir de Paganini"
 S 191 – Study for piano in B flat major
 S 192 – Doubt not love (lost)
 S 193 – Klarster Stimmen
 S 194 – Impromptu for piano in F major
 S 195 – Song for the Birthday of Goethe (1831)
 S 196 – Beständiges
 S 197 – 3 Settings of Scottish Songs for Thompson
 S 198 – Epilogue for Gluck's Armide
 S 199 – The orphan's ode to the patrious
 S 200 – Finale for the 3rd curtain of Errol's Zampa (lost)
 S 201 – Piece for Der Löwe von Kurdistan
 S 202 – Canon: Muntre Gärten
 S 203 – Landestren
 S 204 – Finale for Gustave III
 S 205 – Impromptu for 2 pianos in C major
 S 206, WoO 31 – Das Zauberglöckchen

Works not included in any catalogue 
 Partita in B flat major
 Piano Sonata No.7 in G major
 Piano Sonata No.8 in A flat major
 Piano Sonata No.9 in C major
 Adagio and Rondo alla Polacca for Violin and Orchestra in A major
 Serenade in E flat major
 Violin concerto (incomplete) (about 1806) completed in 1998 by Gregory Rose
 Violin Concerto in G major
 Wind Sextet in F major

References 

 
Hummel